Wacey Hamilton (born September 10, 1990) is a Canadian former professional ice hockey player. He most notably played for the Binghamton Senators and Utica Comets in the American Hockey League (AHL).

Playing career
Hamilton played his junior ice hockey with the Medicine Hat Tigers of the Western Hockey League, ending his junior career in 2011. Undrafted, Hamilton attended the Colorado Avalanche 2010 training camp before returning for his final junior season. On March 8, 2011, the Ottawa Senators of the National Hockey League (NHL) signed Hamilton to a three-year entry-level contract.

He made his professional debut in the 2011–12 season, playing in 74 games for the Binghamton Senators of the American Hockey League (AHL) and two with the Elmira Jackals of the ECHL. In 2012–13, Hamilton missed the season's first 35 games with Binghamton, returning to the line-up to play 38 games with the Senators, recording four goals and four assists.

Following the 2013–14 season, the Senators did not tender a qualifying offer to Hamilton and as a result he became an unrestricted free agent on July 1, 2014. Unable to garner NHL interest, Hamilton accepted a try-out contract with the Utica Comets of the AHL, affiliate to the Vancouver Canucks, on September 29, 2014.

Following his sixth year with the Comets in the COVID-19 pandemic affected 2019–20 season, Hamilton remained a free agent into the delayed 2020–21 season. With health concerns and family considerations, Hamilton announced his retirement from hockey after 9 professional seasons on February 23, 2021.

Career statistics

References

External links

1990 births
Living people
People from Cochrane, Alberta
Ice hockey people from Alberta
Camrose Kodiaks players
Binghamton Senators players
Canadian ice hockey centres
Elmira Jackals (ECHL) players
Medicine Hat Tigers players
Utica Comets players
Canadian expatriate ice hockey players in the United States